Chaska may refer to:

 Chaska, Minnesota, U.S.
 Chaska High School
 Chaska Township, Carver County, Minnesota
 We-Chank-Wash-ta-don-pee or Chaska (died 1862), Dakota Native American

See also